Thomas Finch may refer to:

 Thomas Finch, 2nd Earl of Winchilsea (1578–1639), English peer and member of parliament
Thomas Finch (soldier) (died 1563), English nobleman, knight, soldier, and military commander
 Thomas Finch, List of ambassadors of the Kingdom of England to Russia